Brigadier-General William Graham (died 29 September 1747) was a British Army officer from Balliheridon, county Armagh, Ireland.

Biography
Graham joined the Army as an ensign in the 2nd (Queen's) Regiment of Foot on 1 September 1706, and was present at the Battle of Almanza, where he was taken prisoner. He was promoted to lieutenant on 2 March 1710 and served in the expedition to Canada in 1711. On 23 March 1723 he became lieutenant-colonel of the Queen's Regiment, and on 12 August 1741 he was promoted to colonel of the 54th (later 43rd) Regiment of Foot. He transferred to the colonelcy of the 11th Regiment of Foot on 7 February 1746, was promoted to brigadier-general on 18 April 1746, and took part in the raid on Lorient. He died on 29 September 1747.

Family 
William Graham was the son of Arthur Graham. His daughter and heir, Alice, married Joshua McGeough, of Drumsill, Co. Armargh, progenitor of the McGough-Bond family of Drumsill.

References

1747 deaths
British Army brigadiers
British military personnel of the War of the Spanish Succession
British military personnel of Queen Anne's War
British Army personnel of the War of the Austrian Succession
Queen's Royal Regiment officers
Devonshire Regiment officers
43rd Regiment of Foot officers
Military personnel from County Armagh
Year of birth unknown